The 2002 Super League Grand Final was the Fifth official Grand Final and conclusive and championship-deciding game of Super League VII. Held on Saturday 19 October 2002 at Old Trafford, Manchester, the game was played between St. Helens and Bradford Bulls. Refereed by Russell Smith, the match was seen by a crowd of 61,138 and was won by St Helens 19 - 18.

Background

Route to the Final

St Helens
St Helens, by finishing top of the table automatically qualified for the play-off semi-final where they were drawn at home to Bradford. A surprising loss saw Saints have to go the long route to the grand final by playing bitter rivals Wigan Warriors in the elimination semi-final; a match they won 24–8 to set up another game against Bradford.

Bradford Bulls
Bradford as the team finishing second in the season also qualified for the play-off semi-final where they had to travel to St Helens. A close fought game saw Bradford win 28–26 to go straight through to the grand final.

Match Details

References

2002 Super League Grand Final at rlphotos.com

Super League Grand Finals
St Helens R.F.C. matches
Bradford Bulls matches
Grand final